
Żywiec County is a unit of territorial administration and local government (powiat) in Silesian Voivodeship, southern Poland, on the Slovak border. It came into being on January 1, 1999, as a result of the Polish local government reforms passed in 1998.

As of 2019 its total population is 152,877, out of which the population of Żywiec is 31,194 and the rural population is 121,683.

The county includes part of the protected area known as Żywiec Landscape Park.

Neighbouring counties
Żywiec County is bordered by Cieszyn County to the west, the city of Bielsko-Biała and Bielsko County to the north, Wadowice County to the north-east, and Sucha County to the east. It also borders Slovakia to the south.

Administrative division
The county is subdivided into 15 gminas (one urban and 14 rural). These are listed in the following table, in descending order of population.

References

 
Land counties of Silesian Voivodeship